The 1994 Dubai Open was the second edition of this men's tennis tournament and was played on outdoor hard courts. The tournament was part of the World Series of the 1994 ATP Tour. It took place in Dubai, United Arab Emirates from 31 January through 7 February 1994. Fourth-seeded Magnus Gustafsson won the singles title.

Finals

Singles

 Magnus Gustafsson defeated  Sergi Bruguera, 6–4, 6–2
It was Gustafsson's 2nd singles title of the year and the 7th of his career.

Doubles

 Todd Woodbridge /  Mark Woodforde defeated  Darren Cahill /  John Fitzgerald, 6–7, 6–4, 6–2

References

 
Dubai Tennis Championships
Dubai Open
Dubai Open
Dubai Tennis Championships